Zoonavena is a genus of swift in the family Apodidae. 
It contains the following species:
 Madagascar spinetail (Zoonavena grandidieri)
 São Tomé spinetail (Zoonavena thomensis)
 White-rumped spinetail (Zoonavena sylvatica)

 
Bird genera
Taxonomy articles created by Polbot